James Logan (1797–1872) was a Scottish author on Gaelic culture, best known for his 1831 book  The Scottish Gael.

Life
Logan was born in Aberdeen, where his father was a merchant; he was educated at Aberdeen grammar school and Marischal College. A sports injury made him give up a potential career as a lawyer.

In London with the support of Lord Aberdeen, Logan studied at the Royal Academy. He became a journalist, and then a clerk in an architect's office. He was employed for a time by the Highland Society of London, but never settled to a career. A brother of the London Charterhouse, he was expelled in 1866. With Scottish patrons, he sustained a fair standard of living, and died in London in April 1872.

Works

Logan's major work was The Scottish Gael, or Celtic Manners as preserved among the Highlanders (2 vol.), published in 1831. It was based on walking tours he had made in the Scottish highlands and islands during the previous decade, during which he collected Gaelic antiquities. The work was dedicated to William IV, illustrated by the author, and sold well on good reviews. In 1876 Alexander Stewart published a second edition. From a modern scholarly view its value is largely in the highland customs observed, with the historical material regarded as obsolete. Other works were:

introduction and letterpress to A Collection of Ancient Piobaireachd or Highland Pipe Music (1838) by Angus MacKay (anonymous, an influential publication though not now considered reliable on family history);
introduction to John Mackenzie's Sar-obair nam Bard Gaelach: or Beauties of Gaelic Poetry (2 vols. 1841, new edit. 1877);
letterpress to Robert Ronald McIan's Clans of the Scottish Highlands;
Highland Costumes, 2 vols. illustrated 1843–9; new edit. 1857.

He contributed to the Gentleman's Magazine.

Notes

External links
Attribution

1797 births
1872 deaths
Scottish writers
Scottish illustrators
Writers from Aberdeen
Scottish clans